The 2002 WNBA season was the 3rd and final season for the Miami Sol. The team missed the playoffs for the second and final time in their history. The team later folded after the season due to financial issues.

Offseason

WNBA Draft

Regular season

Season standings

Season schedule

Player stats

References

Miami Sol seasons
Miami
Miami Sol